Jaylan Ford is an American football linebacker for the Texas Longhorns.

High school career 
Ford attended Lone Star High School in Frisco, Texas where he was the District 5-5A-I Defensive MVP as a junior. A 3 star prospect ranked the nations 81st best outside linebacker recruit, Ford originally committed to play college football for Utah before flipping his commitment to Texas.

College career 
After being a role player his first two seasons, Ford emerged as a star his junior season. On October 15, 2022, Ford recorded 8 tackles and two forced turnovers in a 24-21 win over Iowa State and was named the Big 12 defensive player of the week. Ford finished the season with 119 tackles, the second most of any player in the Big 12.

College statistics

References

External links
Texas Longhorns bio

American football linebackers
Living people
Texas Longhorns football players
Year of birth missing (living people)